Divača Airport is 1 of 2 airports still in use after being built for the Battles of the Soča.

JanezLet

Aircraft

History 
Divača airport which is the oldest active airport in Slovenia and it has interesting history.  The airport was built from 1916 to 1917 and it was used as a bomber base during World War I.  After that, the airport was owned by Italian authorities and until 1942 the Italian Army was using it.  After World War II, the airport started to perish.  But in the middle of eighties Divača airport started developing again. There was a gradual development through years. 
Currently the airport has two 800 meters long runways one paved and other one covered with grass, two hangars, control tower, offices and all the necessary equipment for aircraft operations.  Airport Divača is a home for 12 aircraft. It is located at the foot of a hill Vremščica, 3,5 km east from city  of Divača.

External links 

Airports in Slovenia